The River Is Performing Magic  is a 1945 Czechoslovak comedy film directed by Václav Krška.

Cast
 František Hanus as Leopold Kohák
 Růžena Šlemrová as Anna Koháková
 Evelyna Kinská as Helena Koháková
 Svatopluk Beneš as Profesor Korejnil
 František Vnouček as Francois
 Karel Dostal as President Šupita
 Meda Valentová as Šupita's wife
 Jaroslav Marvan as Jaroslav Lebeda
 Jindřich Plachta as Čtverylka

Production
Film was shot at Český Šternberk Castle, Lipnice nad Sázavou, Písek, Těšnov train station in Prague, Divoká Šárka, Rataje nad Sázavou, Světlá nad Sázavou quarry, Zvíkov Castle, Havlíčkův Brod, Zruč nad Sázavou, Jílové u Prahy, Ledeč nad Sázavou and Stříbrná Skalice.
Filming started in 1944 during Nazi occupation produced by German-run Nationalfilm. After the liberation in 1945 the movie was finished by Československá filmová společnost. Actress Anna Steimarová was replaced by Marie Ježková.

External links
 

1940s Czech-language films
1945 films
Czechoslovak black-and-white films
Czechoslovak comedy films
1945 comedy films
1940s Czech films